(Parliamentary) Committee on Cultural Affairs (KrU) is a parliamentary committee in the Swedish Riksdag. The committee areas of responsibility concern general cultural and educational purposes, popular education, youth activities, international cultural cooperation, and sports. The committee also debates church issues and matters concerning radio and television, and immigration and integration policies, insofar as they do not belong to the Constitutional Committee's preparation.

The committee's speaker is Amanda Lind from the Green Party and the vice-speaker is Robert Hannah from the Liberals.

List of speakers for the committee

List of vice-speakers for the committee

References

External links
Civil Affairs Committee 2015 (archived)
Civil Affairs Committee 2020

Committees of the Riksdag